The National Register of Historic Places in the United States is a register including buildings, sites, structures, districts, and objects.  The Register automatically includes all National Historic Landmarks as well as all historic areas administered by the U.S. National Park Service. Since its introduction in 1966, more than 90,000 separate listings have been added to the register.

Current listings by state and territory
The following are approximate tallies of current listings by state and territory on the National Register of Historic Places. These counts are based on entries in the National Register Information Database as of April 24, 2008, and new weekly listings posted since then on the National Register of Historic Places website. There are frequent additions to the listings and occasional delistings and the counts here are approximate and not official.  New entries are added to the official Register on a weekly basis.  Also, the counts in this table exclude boundary increase and decrease listings which modify the area covered by an existing property or district and which carry a separate National Register reference number.  The numbers of NRHP listings in each state are documented by tables in each of the individual state list articles.

A map index to the state lists of NRHPs 

Additional U.S. NRHPs that are not on the map: American Samoa, Guam, Northern Mariana Islands, Puerto Rico, U.S. Minor Outlying Islands, U.S. Virgin Islands

See also 

 African American Historic Places
 History of the National Register of Historic Places
 Keeper of the Register
 National Historic Preservation Act of 1966
 Property type (National Register of Historic Places)
 State Historic Preservation Office

Notes

References

External links
 National Park Service: National Register of Historic Places -  official website
 Travel itineraries - detailed articles, arranged by region and theme
 Recent listings - weekly updates to the Register

.
 
National Register of Historic Places listings
National Register of Historic Places